Drabshalla is a village and municipality in Kishtwar district of the Indian union territory of Jammu and Kashmir. The town is located 22 kilometres from the district headquarters Kishtwar.

Transport

Road
Drabshalla is well-connected by road to other places in Jammu and Kashmir and the rest of the country by the NH 244.

Rail
The nearest railway station to Drabshalla is Udhampur railway station located at a distance of 125 kilometres.

Air
The nearest airport is Jammu Airport located at a distance of 196 kilometres.

See also
Jammu and Kashmir
Kishtwar district
Kishtwar
Kishtwar National Park
Warwan Valley

References

Villages in Kishtwar district